Traveller Double Adventure 6: Divine Intervention/Night of Conquest is two tabletop role-playing game adventures, written by J. Andrew Keith, William H. Keith, and Lawrence Schick for Traveller, and published in tête-bêche format by Game Designers' Workshop in 1982. Divine Intervention/Night of Conquest ranges from a mission to deceive the leader of a religious dictatorship in the Spinward Marches, to adventures of a group of traders caught unawares in an attack on a trade world in the Reavers' Deep Sector.

Reception
William A. Barton reviewed Divine Intervention/Night of Conquest in The Space Gamer No. 59. Barton commented that "both adventures should give referees and players at least one good session of Traveller play each, though Night of Conquest is unquestionably the stronger of the two."

Andy Slack reviewed Night of Conquest/Divine Intervention for White Dwarf #39, giving it an overall rating of 9 out of 10, and stated that "Double Adventure 6 is one (or rather two) of the classic Traveller scenarios."

See also
Classic Traveller Double Adventures

References

Role-playing game supplements introduced in 1982
Traveller (role-playing game) adventures